Tuck Everlasting is an American children's novel written by Natalie Babbitt.

Tuck Everlasting may also refer to:

 Tuck Everlasting (2002 film), 2002 Disney film starring 	Alexis Bledel
 Tuck Everlasting (musical), musical performed on Broadway and in Atlanta 2015–16